Dmitri Aleksandrovich Silin (born 9 July 1967) is a former Russian professional football player.

Honours
 Russian First Division top scorer: 1994 (35 goals).

External links
 

1967 births
Footballers from Saint Petersburg
Living people
Soviet footballers
Russian footballers
Association football forwards
FC Dynamo Saint Petersburg players
FC Baltika Kaliningrad players
FC Dynamo Bryansk players
Russian Premier League players
FC Lukhovitsy players
FC Lokomotiv Saint Petersburg players